Cheongsong County (or Cheongsong-gun) is a county in North Gyeongsang Province, South Korea.

Administrative divisions 

Cheongsong is divided into 1 eup and 7 myeon.

Climate
Cheongsong has a humid continental climate (Köppen: Dwa), but can be considered a borderline humid subtropical climate (Köppen: Cwa) using the  isotherm.

Produce
Cheongsong is known among Koreans for its apples and for a famous prison situated around Cheongsong. Cheongsong apples took up a large percentage of consumed apples in Korea as well as Seoul. Originally, Cheongsong produced a large variety of apples but now produces mainly Korean 'Sundown' apples.

Another famous product of Cheongsong is the Cheongyang pepper, a Korean hot chili pepper. It was developed in Chongsong and Youngyang, hence the portmanteau, "CheongYang"

Attractions
Daejeonsa Temple is the largest in Cheongsong-gun. The Bogwangjeon building, is Korea's treasure no. 1570, and in its procession is the woodblock of a handwritten letter from Lee Yeo-song, a general of the Ming Dynasty, to Samyeong Daisa.

Jusan Pond, located in the county, was the site of filming for Kim Ki-duk's 2003 film Spring, Summer, Fall, Winter... and Spring. The floating monastery was built for the purpose of the film, and Kim obtained permission from the authorities to keep it there for a year. Filming took place over the course of that year, numbering 22 days in total, after which the set was removed and destroyed. The pond is part of a national park, so no buildings are permitted.

Sister cities
 Suqian, China

References

External links
County government website

 
Counties of North Gyeongsang Province